Gymnastics events were competed at the 2005 Mediterranean Games in two disciplines: artistic gymnastics and rhythmic gymnastics.

Medal summary

Men's artistic gymnastics

Women's artistic gymnastics

Rhythmic gymnastics

Medal table

Timetable

Artistic gymnastics events followed this timetable:

References

Sports at the 2005 Mediterranean Games